MXR North East was a regional commercial digital radio multiplex in the United Kingdom, which served the North East. The multiplex closed on 29 July 2013 after the shareholders Global Radio & Arqiva decided not to renew the licence.

Transmitters
MXR North East was transmitted on frequency block 12C from the transmitter sites:

Stations broadcast

Previous services

See also

MXR North West
MXR Severn Estuary
MXR Yorkshire
MXR West Midlands

References

Digital audio broadcasting multiplexes